Radovan Puliš (born 17 September 1991) is a Slovak professional ice hockey player currently playing for HK Dukla Michalovce of the Slovak Extraliga.

Junior career
He played three seasons in the QMJHL: the majority of time playing for Acadie-Bathurst Titan and a short time playing for Rouyn-Noranda Huskies.

Professional career
Puliš began his professional career with HKm Zvolen of the Tipsport Liga.  In the 2014–15 Slovak Extraliga season he was the leading goal scorer with 30 goals.  He also won a league title during the 2012–13 season.

On August 4, 2015, Puliš joined HC Slovan Bratislava of the Kontinental Hockey League. He played five games for the team and scoring one goal before returning to Zvolen on loan.

International career
Puliš played for the Slovakian U-17 and U-18 national teams before making his debut for the Slovakia men's national ice hockey team in 2015.

Career statistics

Regular season and playoffs
Bold indicates led league

Awards and honors

References

External links

1991 births
Living people
Acadie–Bathurst Titan players
HC 07 Detva players
Rouyn-Noranda Huskies players
Slovak ice hockey forwards
HC Slovan Bratislava players
HKM Zvolen players
HK Dukla Michalovce players
Slovak expatriate ice hockey players in Canada
Slovak expatriate ice hockey players in Switzerland